Motru is a city in Romania, Gorj County. It is situated on the river Motru in western Oltenia. The county capital Târgu Jiu is located about 35 km northeast. The city administers eight villages: Dealu Pomilor, Horăști, Însurăței, Leurda, Lupoița, Ploștina, Roșiuța and Râpa.

History 

Motru was created by an administrative decision on the day of 24 May 1966 on the territory of the former Ploștina commune, which, together with seven other villages, became part of the new city. The reason behind the decision to create a city was the development of several coal deposits.

The region is at least since the time of the Roman Empire inhabited, in Leurda in 1964, some silver coins from the era of Emperor Septimius Severus (193-211) were found. The oldest documented settlement in the territory of present-day town Ploștina (1385 is mentioned).

The Dacian town Amutria is mentioned in ancient sources like Ptolemy's Geographia (c. 150 AD) and Tabula Peutingeriana (2nd century AD), and potentially placed here. The name is homonymous with the ancient name of Motru river.
After the Roman conquest of Dacia, Amutria was part of an important road network, between Drubetis and Pelendava.

In 1981, Motru was the site of riots from miners who were working in the mines of the city. The riots, which took place between 17 and 19 October of that year, were triggered by poor work conditions, tight control of legislative organizations and the general exhaustion of the miners, further exacerbated by a decree that limited consumption of bread only to the dwellers of the city. During the riots, Emil Bobu visited the city, where he was attacked by angry crowds with potatoes; when he returned to Bucharest, he ordered the army to intervene in the city after 2 days of protests from the local populace. At the time, the inexpensive Motru bread attracted many workers and farmers into the city, who carried the bread loafs in sacks and arrived in the town by local trains known as "trains of hunger". Nowadays the bread factory is in ruins.

Present 

In today's incorporated villages were partially free farmers, others were in the monastery Tismana submissive.

Motru was declared a municipiu in 2000.

Mining is the city's main industry; agriculture and livestock are also important, especially in its attached villages.

At the 2011 census, the population was 18,142, including 17,988 Romanians, 38 Hungarians, 83 Roma and 3 Germans.

Transportation 

Motru is the terminus of a railway line that branches off the main line Bucharest–Craiova–Lugoj at Strehaia, which was put into operation in 1962. Several times a day commuter trains travel to Craiova. In addition, there are bus connections with the district capital of Târgu Jiu. Motru is on the National Road 67 from Drobeta-Turnu Severin to Râmnicu Vâlcea.

Natives
 Gabriel Cruceru
 Dorel Mutică

Notes

References 

 

Populated places in Gorj County
Localities in Oltenia
Cities in Romania
Mining communities in Romania
Monotowns in Romania
Planned cities in Romania
Socialist planned cities
Populated places established in 1966
1966 establishments in Romania